Abraham Naibei Cheroben (born 11 October 1992) is a Kenyan born Bahraini long-distance runner who won the Valencia Half Marathon in 2014 and 2015. He finished tenth in the 10,000 m event at the 2016 Summer Olympics. In 2017 he won the Copenhagen Half in the 4th ever best time for a half marathon: 58.40 min

References

External links

 

1992 births
Living people
Bahraini male long-distance runners
Naturalized citizens of Bahrain
Kenyan emigrants to Bahrain
Olympic athletes of Bahrain
Athletes (track and field) at the 2016 Summer Olympics
Athletes (track and field) at the 2018 Asian Games
World Athletics Championships athletes for Bahrain
Asian Games medalists in athletics (track and field)
Asian Games gold medalists for Bahrain
Medalists at the 2018 Asian Games